Tan Kin Lian  (born 9 March 1948) is a Singaporean businessman who served as the chief executive officer of NTUC Income between 1997 and 2007, before standing for the 2011 presidential election.

Business career

CEO of NTUC Income
Tan became the general manager of NTUC Income in 1977, at the age of 29. He was subsequently re-designated as the chief executive officer and remained in this position until April 2007. Under his leadership, the company has grown from having S$28 million in assets in 1977 to more than S$17 billion in assets and over one million policyholders in 2007.

Tan ran NTUC Income with the aim of providing the best value to the policyholders. This meant lower fees for insurance agents, encouragement of direct selling practices which bypassed the agents altogether, and low operating expenses—throughout his 30-year term as CEO, Tan flew the economy class, even on long haul flights. This management style clashed with some of NTUC Income's board members, who preferred the company to be run on a more commercial or professional basis, and even advocated it to be privatised. The board asked Tan to step down after completing his 30-year term at the helm.

Other positions
Tan's portfolio in 2007 mentioned more than 60 directorships and other corporate appointments. Of these, the most notable was as Chairman of International Co-operative & Mutual Insurance Federation from 1992 to 1997, an international organisation which at that time represented 123 insurance groups in 65 countries, employing 260,000 people. The total assets of the members of this international federation totalled US$1.5 trillion in 1997.

Post-retirement interlude
Since retiring from NTUC Income in 2007, Tan has provided free financial advice and opinions on current affairs through his blog, and had established the Financial Service Consumer Association (FISCA) to educate people about long-term financial security. During the 2008 financial crisis, he organised public rallies for people who lost their money due to investing in Lehman Brothers' Minibond products. The rallies resulted in a petition to Singapore Government, signed by 983 investors.

Political career
A former member of the governing People's Action Party (PAP) for 30 years, he left the party in 2008 due to his inactivity, and disagreement with the party's value system. He also served as the party's branch secretary at Marine Parade for three years and was picked by Goh Chok Tong in 1977, to test a pilot scheme for setting up block committees, now known as Residents' Committees (RC). 

For the first ten years, Tan was active in Marine Parade constituency but became inactive for the next 20 years, after moving to Upper Thomson and later Yio Chu Kang.

2011 presidential election

Tan had already expressed his interest in becoming the president of Singapore in 2008.

On 7 June 2011, Tan announced that he would be contesting in the 2011 presidential election. Following his announcement, he promised to donate a significant part of the S$4 million presidential salary to a specially formed charity and circulated several statements outlining his position on the role of the president, including a controversial statement on safeguarding the reserves. The statements drew a mild rebuke from senior members of the Singapore Government, who attempted to publicly clarify that the elected president has only "custodial powers" and not "executive powers". In response, Tan issued another statement, where he agreed with the limitations but nevertheless stressed that "the president does not need to be armed with strong executive powers to make an impact. A well qualified and properly elected President will make his impact through the power to persuade, to influence, to counsel, to convey feedback and if necessary, to articulate informed positions on specific issues".

On 7 July 2011, Tan submitted the presidential eligibility forms. Tan had submitted his application for the Certificate of Eligibility under a Special Clause, citing his experience as CEO of an insurance cooperative with a shared capital of S$500 million and assets of S$17 billion. He was granted the Certificate of Eligibility on 11 August 2011 along with the other three candidates.

In an interview with Channel NewsAsia, Tan said that his main reason for running: "Many people said they want voice, they want to be heard. I think I probably represent the person who has got ears to listen and is able to think independently." Tan thinks the role of the elected president should be expanded and suggested, for example, having the president's office produce an annual report detailing the country's reserves.

In response to rumours circulating that Tan would be dropping out of the presidential race early, he refuted such claims and expressed that he would be filing his nomination papers as planned. After submitting his nomination forms on 17 August 2011, he made his nomination day speech in four of the official languages of Singapore; English, Chinese, Malay, and Tamil. He was the only who do so.

Tan advocated on the need for the burden of National Service (NS) to be shared by all segments of the society, including females and non-citizens.

Tan's symbol is a "Hi-5". He explained "the raised hand signifies willingness to do public service, while the five fingers signify his values of honesty, fairness, positive attitude, courage and public service."

He garnered the lowest number of votes among the four candidates, with 4.9% of the vote. His failure to achieve at least 12.5% of the vote, contributed to his loss of S$48,000 deposit.

Honours
 :
  Public Service Medal (1983)
  Public Service Star (2004)

Personal life
Tan is married to Tay Siew Hong and they have three children together. 

He enjoys making puzzles like Sudoku, Logic9 and Shape Quiz, and online games like Family Life and Business Simulation which stimulate creative abilities and teach risk management.

Friendship with Ong Teng Cheong
Tan was close to Ong Teng Cheong, the fifth president of Singapore. When Ong was elected as President, Tan presented him a set of orchid motif ties in different colours, which were commissioned by NTUC Income and made in the United Kingdom. Ong liked the tie in red color and used it on a number of important occasions, including Nomination Day and his inauguration as the president of Singapore. He also wore it for his presidential portrait which was displayed in government offices and other organisations. 
	
Tan was involved in several initiative introduced by Ong, such as the Singapore Dance Theatre (SDT), the first Singapore expedition to Mount Everest, and the President's Star Charity. Tan promoted the SDT performances to the policyholders of NTUC Income and later joined the board of directors, where he served for 12 years. NTUC Income became one of the main sponsors of the Mount Everest expedition.

During the last two years of Ong Teng Cheong's term, Tan chaired the President's Star Charity event to raise funds and to promote the Singapore Dress. When Ong's wife died, shortly after the second charity dinner, Tan organised 1,000 messages of condolences from Singaporeans, submitted through the Internet, and presented the book to Ong.

References

External links

Personal blog

Singaporean activists
Singaporean businesspeople
Living people
Singaporean people of Chinese descent
Raffles Institution alumni
1948 births
Independent politicians in Singapore
Recipients of the Pingat Bakti Masyarakat
Recipients of the Bintang Bakti Masyarakat
People's Action Party politicians